Pool D of the 2007 Rugby World Cup began on 7 September and concluded on 30 September. The pool was composed of World Cup hosts France, Argentina, Georgia, Ireland and Namibia.

Standings
Pool D was expected to be the Pool of Death in the 2007 tournament and so it proved: the final rankings were only determined after the last round of matches. The pool was won by Argentina, who won all their matches, while France, who lost to Argentina in the opening game of the tournament, finished in second place. Ireland, whom many commentators had expected to do well, were eliminated after winning only two matches, against Georgia and Namibia: Georgia came close to scoring a winning try late in their game, while Namibia recorded their best World Cup result against a team ranked in the top 10.

All times local (UTC+2)

France vs Argentina

Notes
This was the third consecutive World Cup in which Argentina played the tournament host in the competition's opening match. In 1999, the Pumas lost 23–18 to Wales and in 2003 lost 24–8 to Australia.
The three points from Skrela's second half penalty is the lowest points total in a half in World Cup history.
This was the second consecutive world cup match (following the 2003 final), in which the winner was scoreless in the second half.
This was the fifth win for Argentina in their last six Tests against France, whose sole win in November 2006 was by one point.
Argentina became the second side to beat the hosts in the opening match, after New Zealand beat England in 1991 at Twickenham.
It was France's first defeat in the first round of the World Cup (although they had a 20–20 draw against Scotland in 1987). Only New Zealand now have a 100% record in the first round.

Ireland vs Namibia

Notes
Brian O'Driscoll took sole possession of the all-time Ireland try-scoring lead from teammate Denis Hickie with his 30th try.
This was Namibia's best result in a World Cup match, surpassing a thirty-point defeat to Romania in 2003.

Argentina vs Georgia

Ireland vs Georgia

France vs Namibia

France vs Ireland

Argentina vs Namibia

Georgia vs Namibia

France vs Georgia

Ireland vs Argentina

Notes
This was the second time that Argentina had eliminated Ireland from a Rugby World Cup, having also done so in the 1999 Rugby World Cup quarter-final play-off.
This was Paul Honiss' 44th test as referee, equalling the record of Welsh referee Derek Bevan.

References

Pool D
2007–08 in French rugby union
2007–08 in Irish rugby union
2007 in Argentine rugby union
rugby union
rugby union